Elisabeth Johanna Wilhelmina Meliesie (born 2 January 1963), known as Ellen Meliesie, is a Dutch rower. She competed in the women's lightweight double sculls event at the 1996 Summer Olympics.

References

External links
 

1963 births
Living people
Dutch female rowers
Olympic rowers of the Netherlands
Rowers at the 1996 Summer Olympics
Sportspeople from Zwolle